"Never Miss Your Water" is a song by Australian rock musician Diesel. It was released as the first single from his second studio album, The Lobbyist (1993), in 1993. The song charted at number 12 in Australia and number 17 in New Zealand. At the ARIA Music Awards of 1994, the song was nominated for three awards: Single of the Year, Song of the Year, and Producer of the Year, losing in all cases to "The Honeymoon Is Over" by the Cruel Sea. At the APRA Awards of 1994, the song won the APRA Award for Most Performed Australian Work.

Track listing
CD single
 "Never Miss Your Water" – 3:54
 "Picture of You" – 4:36

Weekly charts

References

1993 singles
1993 songs
APRA Award winners
Diesel (musician) songs
EMI Records singles
Songs written by Diesel (musician)